The 2022 Singapore Open (officially known as the Singapore Badminton Open 2022) was a badminton tournament which took place at Singapore Indoor Stadium in Singapore from 12 to 17 July 2022 and had a total purse of $370,000.

Tournament
The 2022 Singapore Open was the fourteenth tournament of the 2022 BWF World Tour and also part of the Singapore Open championships, which had been held since 1929. This tournament was organized by the Singapore Badminton Association with sanction from the BWF.

Venue
This international tournament was held at Singapore Indoor Stadium in Singapore.

Point distribution
Below is the point distribution table for each phase of the tournament based on the BWF points system for the BWF World Tour Super 500 event.

Prize pool
The total prize money was US$370,000 with the distribution of the prize money in accordance with BWF regulations.

Men's singles

Seeds 

 Viktor Axelsen (withdrew)
 Anders Antonsen (withdrew)
 Chou Tien-chen (second round)
 Anthony Sinisuka Ginting (champion)
 Jonatan Christie (second round)
 Loh Kean Yew (semi-finals)
 Srikanth Kidambi (first round)
 Ng Ka Long (first round)

Finals

Top half

Section 1

Section 2

Bottom half

Section 3

Section 4

Women's singles

Seeds 

 Tai Tzu-ying (second round)
 Chen Yufei (withdrew)
 P. V. Sindhu (champion)
 Ratchanok Intanon (first round)
 He Bingjiao (second round)
 Pornpawee Chochuwong (quarter-finals)
 Busanan Ongbamrungphan (first round)
 Michelle Li (withdrew)

Finals

Top half

Section 1

Section 2

Bottom half

Section 3

Section 4

Men's doubles

Seeds 

 Marcus Fernaldi Gideon / Kevin Sanjaya Sukamuljo (withdrew)
 Mohammad Ahsan / Hendra Setiawan (semi-finals)
 Lee Yang / Wang Chi-lin (second round)
 Fajar Alfian / Muhammad Rian Ardianto (final)
 Ong Yew Sin / Teo Ee Yi (second round)
 Goh Sze Fei / Nur Izzuddin (second round)
 Mark Lamsfuß / Marvin Seidel (first round)
 Pramudya Kusumawardana / Yeremia Rambitan (withdrew)

Finals

Top half

Section 1

Section 2

Bottom half

Section 3

Section 4

Women's doubles

Seeds 

 Chen Qingchen / Jia Yifan (withdrew)
 Jongkolphan Kititharakul / Rawinda Prajongjai (quarter-finals)
 Gabriela Stoeva / Stefani Stoeva (first round)
 Liu Xuanxuan / Xia Yuting (quarter-finals)
 Zhang Shuxian / Zheng Yu (final)
 Du Yue / Li Wenmei (semi-finals)
 Linda Efler / Isabel Lohau (second round)
 Benyapa Aimsaard / Nuntakarn Aimsaard (second round)

Finals

Top half

Section 1

Section 2

Bottom half

Section 3

Section 4

Mixed doubles

Seeds 

 Dechapol Puavaranukroh / Sapsiree Taerattanachai (champions)
 Zheng Siwei / Huang Yaqiong (withdrew)
 Wang Yilyu / Huang Dongping (final)
 Tang Chun Man / Tse Ying Suet (quarter-finals)
 Tan Kian Meng / Lai Pei Jing (withdrew)
 Mark Lamsfuß / Isabel Lohau (quarter-finals)
 Goh Soon Huat / Shevon Jemie Lai (semi-finals)
 Mathias Christiansen / Alexandra Bøje (second round)

Finals

Top half

Section 1

Section 2

Bottom half

Section 3

Section 4

References

External links
 Tournament Link

Singapore Open (badminton)
Singapore Open
Singapore Open
Singapore Open